Lost in Panic Room is a 2010 Chinese suspense thriller film directed by Zhang Fanfan and written by Xiao Yu. The film stars Alec Su, Pace Wu, Hu Ming, and Jerry Yuan. It was followed by sequel Lost in Panic Cruise. The film was released in China on October 30, 2010.

Summary
Liu Yunfei, a novelist who is well known for writing detective stories, finds himself in the middle of a real-life murder mystery. Using the knowledge gathered while putting together detective narratives, he sets out to help solve the puzzling series of murders that took place in a mountain villa.

Cast
Alec Su as Liu Yunfei
Pace Wu as Zhang Hui
Hu Ming as Li Xiaofeng
Jerry Yuan as Mike
Du Junze as Zhuo Ran
Shi Guanghui as Bai Xiuqing
Lin Longqi as Lin Quan
Yang Xiao as Lin Hai
Li Wanyi as Lin Xiaoyu
Liu Xiaoxi as Duan Xinyu
Zhang Yukui as Master Jiang
Yu Dongjiang as Zhang Siyi

Box office
It grossed ￥10 million on its first weekend.

References

External links
 
 

2010s Mandarin-language films
Chinese thriller films
Chinese suspense films
2010 thriller films
2010 films
Films directed by Zhang Fanfan